Pustularia  is a small genus of medium-sized sea snails or cowries, marine gastropod mollusks in the subfamily Pustulariinae of the family Cypraeidae, the cowries.

Distribution
These sea snails are found along the coast of East Africa, Australia, Hawaii, the Philippines, the Red Sea and in the Indo-Pacific region in general.

Species
Species within the genus Pustularia include:
Pustularia bistrinotata Schilder & Schilder, 1937
Pustularia chiapponii Lorenz, 1999 
Pustularia cicercula  (Linnaeus, 1758)
Pustularia globulus  (Linnaeus, 1758)
Pustularia jandeprezi Poppe & Martin, 1997 (synonym : Pustularia bistrinotata jandeprezi)
 † Pustularia korneli Fehse & Vicián, 2021
 † Pustularia lodanensis (F. A. Schilder, 1937) 
 Pustularia marerubra Lorenz, 2009
Pustularia margarita  (Dillwyn, 1817) : Pearl cowry
Pustularia margarita africana  Lorenz, F. Jr. & A. Hubert, 1993 
Pustularia margarita tuamotensis  Lorenz, F. Jr. & A. Hubert, 1993 
Pustularia mauiensis  (Burgess, 1967) Maui chick-pea cowry (endemic to Hawaii)

Species  brought into synonymy
Pustularia childreni (Gray, 1825): synonym of Ipsa childreni (Gray, 1825)
 Pustularia mariae Schilder, 1927 accepted as Annepona mariae (Schilder, 1927) (original combination)
 Pustularia maricola C. N. Cate, 1976 accepted as Nesiocypraea lisetae maricola (C. N. Cate, 1976) (original combination)
 † Pustularia pisiformis F. A. Schilder, 1932 accepted as † Ficadusta pisiformis (F. A. Schilder, 1932) (original combination)
 † Pustularia rugifera Schilder, 1927 accepted as † Maestratia rugifera (Schilder, 1927) (original combination)
 Pustularia tricornis (Jousseaume, 1874) accepted as Pustularia cicercula tricornis (Jousseaume, 1874)
Pustularia tuamotensis Lorenz & Huber, 1993: synonym of Pustularia margarita var. tuamotensis Lorenz & Huber, 1993 accepted as Pustularia margarita (Dillwyn, 1817)
 Pustularia wattsi Lorenz, 2000 accepted as Pustularia mauiensis wattsi Lorenz, 2000

References

 Lorenz F. (2014). Monograph of the genus Pustularia (Gastropoda: Cypraeidae). Harxheim: ConchBooks. 130 pp
 Lorenz, F. (2017). Cowries. A guide to the gastropod family Cypraeidae. Volume 1, Biology and systematics. Harxheim: ConchBooks. 644 pp.

External links
 Swainson, W. (1840). A treatise on malacology or shells and shell-fish. London, Longman. viii + 419 pp

OBIS Indo-Pacific Molluscan database
ZipcodeZoo

Cypraeidae